Individual jumping equestrian at the 2002 Asian Games was held in Busan Equestrian Grounds, Busan, South Korea from October 11 to October 14, 2002.

Schedule
All times are Korea Standard Time (UTC+09:00)

Results
Legend
EL — Eliminated
WD — Withdrawn

Qualifier

Final

References
Results

External links
Official website

Individual jumping